United Nations Security Council Resolution 52, adopted on June 22, 1948, having received the first, second and third reports of the Atomic Energy Commission the Council directed the Secretary-General to transmit the second and third reports, along with a record of the Council deliberations on them, to the General Assembly and the Member States.

The resolution passed with nine votes to none; the Ukrainian SSR and Soviet Union abstained.

See also
 List of United Nations Security Council Resolutions 1 to 100 (1946–1953)

References
Text of the Resolution at undocs.org

External links
 

 0052
June 1948 events